Epinotia lindana, the diamondback epinotia moth, is a moth of the family Tortricidae. It is found in North America, records include British Columbia, Ontario, Quebec, Alberta, North Carolina, Washington and Pennsylvania.

The wingspan is about 17 mm.

The larvae feed on Cornus species.

Reference

External links
Bug Guide
Images

Olethreutinae
Moths of North America
Moths described in 1892